JPX may refer to:

 JPX (Brazilian company), a defunct vehicle manufacturer
 Jpx (gene)
 Japonic languages
 Japan Exchange Group
 JPEG 2000, an image format
 JPX, a model of Music Man guitar